The Early Paleo-Eskimo is the first of three distinct periods of human occupation recognized by archaeologists in the eastern North American Arctic, the others being the Late Paleo-Eskimo and the Thule. Dates for these occupations vary according to specific geographic region and cultural historical perspective, but it is generally agreed that the Early Paleo-Eskimo approximately spans the period from 4500 BP to 2800-2300 BP.

The Early Paleo-Eskimo tradition 
The Early Paleo-Eskimo tradition is known by a number of local, and sometimes spatially and temporally overlapping and related variants including the Independence I culture in the High Arctic and Greenland, Saqqaq culture in Greenland, Pre-Dorset in the High and Central Arctic and the Baffin/Ungava region and Groswater in Newfoundland and Labrador. More generally these are subsumed under a larger microlith tradition known as the Arctic Small Tool Tradition. Their ancestral origins are presumed to lie in Alaska, and ultimately Siberia and Eurasia.

Sources 
 Murray, M.S. (2005). Prehistoric Use of Ringed Seals: A Zooarchaeological Study from Arctic Canada. Environmental Archaeology 10 (1): 19–38.

Archaeological cultures of North America
Archaeology of Canada
Archaeology of Newfoundland and Labrador
Archaeology of Nunavut
Archaeology of Greenland
Indigenous peoples in Northern Canada
Prehistory of the Arctic
Eskimos
Peopling of the Americas